The WayFM Network is a national, non-profit radio broadcasting network in the United States, primarily playing Christian adult contemporary music. While WayFM is based in Colorado Springs, Colorado, content creation and programming originates in Franklin, Tennessee and operates stations in 12 states (as of May 2018).

History

Origins in Fort Myers
WAY Media, Inc. was founded in 1987 by Bob Augsburg. The non-profit corporation began as a single FM radio station in Fort Myers, Florida.

In the early 1980s, Bob and Felice Augsburg were residing in Fort Myers, where Bob was working as the Program Director at WSOR, a Christian radio station formatted for older adults. Bob and Felice have said that they "were compelled by the burden to see a younger audience reached and Bob began producing a Saturday evening broadcast geared for youth." This program, which aired on WSOR, became the springboard for Christian Rock concerts in the area and the impetus for a 24/7 station with this type of format.

Much discussion with local parents and business people led to a non-profit Florida corporation and an application filed with the Federal Communications Commission (FCC) for an unused FM frequency.

On Christmas Eve (December 24) 1986, the group received its permit for the construction of a new non-commercial FM station in Fort Myers, WAYJ. On October 9, 1987, WAYJ, broadcasting as "WAY-FM", signed on the air.

Growth
By 1992, three WAY-FM radio stations were on the air—including Fort Myers; Nashville, Tennessee (WAYM); and West Palm Beach, Florida (WAYF).

In the mid-90s, WAY-FM stations, beginning with WAYF, began to sponsor and organize large Christian music concerts and day-long music festivals. Within a few years, Nashville and Fort Myers also began to sponsor major Christian music events.

After several years of planning, in 1996, WAY-FM began the Christian Hit Radio Satellite Network (CHRSN). The network was designed to help other stations who desired to reach the youth and young adults of their respective communities but lacked the manpower or resources to operate a station on their own.

Corporate office established
In 2001, WAY-FM Media Group established a corporate office in Colorado Springs, Colorado where Bob Augsburg, the president and founder now lives. Dusty Rhodes, former Station Manager of WAYF, joined Augsburg in Colorado as Chief Operating Officer and is now the ministry's Senior Vice President.

In 2005, Dar Ringling joined the ministry as Chief Financial Officer while Lloyd Parker, formerly General Manager of the K-LOVE & Air1 Radio Networks, became the Chief Operating Officer.

In 2012, WAY-FM shifted from its long time Christian CHR format to a Christian Adult Contemporary format, along with shifting their audience from 18- to 34-year-olds, to older adults (25-54), thus growing up with its original audience more or less. Since 2013 WAY-FM via flagship station WAYM, Nashville is a Christian AC reporter to the Nielsen BDS service, and became a monitored reporter to Mediabase's Christian AC panel in April 2015.

In July 2013, WAY-FM ceased providing programming to non-owned stations via satellite, with the exception of the network morning show, The Wally Show. In 2017, The Wally Show stopped syndication, as well.

In May 2015, WAY-FM announced plans to acquire KVRK, in North Texas.  The Station calls letters are now KAWA and now broadcasts the national WAY-FM format. The former Power FM however has become an online music channel, app, and community of Christian rock fans managed by WAY-FM Media Group.

New CEO 
In August 2017, founder Bob Augsburg officially retired from his position as CEO. Bob remains on the board of directors and is still involved in the ministry. John Scaggs was chosen as the new CEO.

Merger with Hope Media Group
On January 26, 2022; it was announced that Way Media Group would merge with Hope Media Group based out of Houston, Texas.  Hope Media Group owns and operates heritage Christian AC station KSBJ 89.3, and Spanish Christian AC sister KHVU 91.7 (Vida Unida), along with internet radio station NGEN Radio which features a pop and Hip-Hop leaning Christian CHR format.

Current reach
At this time, WAY-FM owns and operates 20 full power FM radio stations. WAY-FM also owns 24 translator stations.  WAY-FM is also heard online and offers two online exclusive streams. NGEN radio streaming Christian Pop and Hip-Hop and Way Loud streaming Christian Active/Alternative Rock.

Station list

Alabama

Colorado

Florida

Georgia

Indiana

Kansas

Kentucky

Oregon

South Carolina

Tennessee

Texas

Washington

References

External links
 Official website

 
American radio networks
Religion in Colorado Springs, Colorado
Christianity in Colorado
Christian rock
Radio stations established in 1987
Radio broadcasting companies of the United States